B26, B-26 or B.26 may refer to:

Games
 Sicilian Defence, Encyclopaedia of Chess Openings code

Military
 BAM B26, a pellet gun manufactured in China
 Blackburn B.26 Botha, a British World War II torpedo bomber
 Douglas A-26 Invader, an American Cold War bomber, which was designated B-26 from 1948 until 1962
 Fokker B 26, a proposed dive bomber derived from the G.I for the Swedish Air Force
 Martin B-26 Marauder, an American World War II bomber
 Soviet submarine B-26, a Soviet Cold War submarine

Transportation
 Bundesstraße 26, a road in Germany
 B26 (New York City bus), an American bus route